Kuzeyevo (Küźäy) is a rural locality (a selo) and the administrative centre of Kuzeyevsky Selsoviet, Buzdyaksky District, Bashkortostan, Russia. The population was 492 as of 2010. There are 6 streets.

Geography 
Kuzeyevo is located 40 km north of Buzdyak (the district's administrative centre) by road. Akhun is the nearest rural locality.

References 

Rural localities in Buzdyaksky District